Guruvayur Satyagraha took place in (1931–32) and was a Satyagraha (non-violent protest) in the present Thrissur district, which was then part of Ponnani Taluk of Malabar district, now part of Kerala, which was an effort to allow entry for untouchables into the Guruvayur Temple. It was led by K. Kelappan, who undertook a hunger strike for 12 days until it was abandoned because of a request from Mahatma Gandhi and the Indian National Congress. Mahatma Gandhi hailed it as "the miracle of modern times" and "a smriti which is peoples charter of spiritual emancipation". K. Kelappan, A.K Gopalan (volunteer captain), P. Krishna Pillai, Mannathu Padmanabhan and N.P Damodaran Nair were the leaders of that agitation. It was a failure, For another four years, nothing much changed in Guruvayur or in the rest of the region that today constitutes the State of Kerala. It was only in 1936 that many temples in Kerala were opened for all to use.

When Samuthiri, the temple trustee was reluctant to concede as the second phase of the struggle K.Kelappan and Manathu Padmanabhan started fast unto death from 22 September 1932 onwards. But due to Gandhiji's intervention on 2 October, the struggle was withdrawn. According to Gandhi, Kelappan had committed two errors. In the first instance, he ought to have previously consulted Gandhi,  as an expert director in matters like fast,  but he failed to do so;  secondly,  he should have given the Zamorin (Temple guardians) reasonable notice of his intention to go on fast.  Gandhi felt coercion in Kelappan’s fast. One of the major incidents that happened was the assault of A.K Gopalan by the opponents of the satyagraha movement. It roused the passion of the rebels to attempt a forceful entry into the temple and led to the provisional closure of the temple.

Subsequently, there was an opinion poll held at Ponnani taluk in which 77 per cent favoured the entry of all castes into the temples. Leaders,  from various parts of Kerala, were later in leadership of C. Rajagopalachari and other Indian national congress leaders such as P. Krishna Pillai and A. K. Gopalan,  took part in the effort. The right to enter temples was granted to "Backward" Hindus like Ezhavas only in 1936 in India by the Maharajah of Travancore and the Temple Entry Proclamation.

Kandoth assault

The caste system was strongest then in northern Kerala, where lower castes were not allowed to walk on the public road in front of a Thiyyar caste temple in present day Kannur and Payyannur.  The reason was that the nearby temple would be impure.  A group consisting of Kelappan and A. K. Gopalan took out a procession along this road along with Harijans to promote the Guruvayoor Satyagraha.  As the procession neared the road, a crowd of about 200 men and women began to brutally beat the processionists by the Thiyyar chiefs present. AKG and others were beaten up by the women with sticks.  The attack lasted for half an hour.  A. K. G. and the Keralites fainted.  Even the Keralite's death statement was recorded.  This beating later became famous as the Kantoth attack or (also known as Kandoth assault ).  This was the first beating in A. K. Gopalan's political life.

The Kandothe Kuruvadi was the best campaign the Guruvayur Satyagraha got.  The Malabar District Board official arrived at Kandoth and placed a board on the road saying that everyone is authorized to travel.

References

External links
 Kerala Cafe: Kerala History
 JSTOR: Temple-entry Movement in Travancore by Robin Jeffrey - requires JSTOR access beyond first page.

Hindu law
Hindu movements
History of Kerala
History of Thrissur district
Nonviolent resistance movements
Social history of Kerala
Guruvayur